In 2006, there were 17 This American Life episodes.

Act 1: Luck of the Irish – Ira Glass
Act 2: Taxation Without Inebriation
Act 3: Bad Morning America – Davy Rothbart
Act 4: Function of the Heart

Act 1: Brooklyn Archipelago – Brett Martin
Act 2: The Thin Gray Line – Cheryl Wagner
Act 3: Yes, In My Backyard – Jorge Just

Act 1: Prisoner of Love – Shant Kenderian
Act 2: The Diary of Mrs. Sam Horrigan – Catalina Puente
Act 3: So a Squirrel and a Chipmunk Walk Into a Bar – David Sedaris

Act 1: El Gato Y El Ratoncito – James Spring
Act 2: Hello Kitty – David Sedaris
Act 3: Looking for Loveseats in all the Wrong Places – David Segal
Act 4: Spray My Name, Spray My Name – Brian Thomas Gallagher

Act 1: There's No U.S. in Habeas – Jack Hitt
Act 2: September 11, 1660 – Jon Ronson
Act 3: We Interrogate the Detainees – Jack Hitt

Act 1: Mother of Invention – Karen Sosnoski
Act 2: Everything Must Go – Sudhir Alladi Venkatesh
Act 3: What Would Fill-in-the-Blank Do? – Brett Martin
Act 4: Squashing the Creative Spirit – Andy Raskin

Show description: A return to two live shows from the TAL archive including show 36, "Letters" and show 66, "Tales from the Net".
Act 1: Letters
Act 2: Internet

Act 1: Two Possibilities, Both Bad – Ira Glass
Act 2: The Grandma Letters – Will Seymour, Mortified
Act 3: My Angel's in the Centerfolds – Thea Chaloner

Act 1: Who Takes the Class Out of Class Reunion – Jon Ronson
Act 2: Life Without Leanne – Larry Doyle
Act 3: Deal of a Lifetime – Sarah Koenig (rebroadcast from episode 162)
Act 4: One Word: Timing – Tami Sagher

Act 1: Parrot – Ira Glass, Alex Lane, and Erik Holm
Act 2: Pig – Jonathan Goldstein
Act 3: Combo Platter – David Sedaris

Act 1: Love Is A Battlefield – Alix Spiegel
Act 2: Hit Me With Your Best Shot – Dave Royko

Act 1: Objects in Side View Mirror Are Truer Than They Appear – Alex Kotlowitz
Act 2: Unwelcome Wagon – Ira Glass
Music interlude: Dave Barker, I Got to Get Away
Act 3: Waiting for Joe – Shalom Auslander
Music interlude: Bettye LaVette, The High Road 

Show description: Scary stories that are all true.
Prologue: Ira Glass and Albert Donnay read a ghost story from a 1921 medical journal.
Act 1: The Hills Have Eyes – Alix Blumberg
Music interlude: 45 Grave, Evil
Act 2: The Hitcher – Ira Glass
Act 3: And the Call Was Coming from ... the Listeners!
Act 4: Graveyard Shift – David Sedaris
Music interlude: Gnarls Barkley, The Boogie Monster

Show description: Discussion about a new study by The Lancet about the number of Iraqis who have died since the US invasion.
Prologue: Ira Glass talks with ordinary Iraqis about life after the invasion.
Act 1: Truth, Damn Truth and Statistics – Alex Blumberg
Act 2: Not Just a Number
Act 3: The War This Time – Ira Glass
Music interlude: The Roots, Somebody's Gotta Do It

Prologue:  a story about a German interpreter for Ford whose skills fail him
Act 1: Mr. Central High 
Act 2: I'm Not a Doctor, but I Play One at the Holiday Inn
Act 3: If This Ark Is A-Rockin', Don't Come A-Knockin''' – Jonathan Goldstein interprets the story of Noah's Ark

Show description:  Stories of Muslim and non-Muslim relations.
Prologue:  A depiction of the Prophet Mohammed on display in the main courtroom of the U.S. Supreme Court.
Act 1: Which One of These Is Not Like the Others?—Why is it so hard for Muslims and non-Muslims to get along in the fourth grade?
Act 2: America the Ad Campaign'' – Shalom Auslander

External links
This American Lifes radio archive for 2006

2006
This American Life
This American Life